Raksila Artificial Ice Rink Pakkalan kenttä, also called Raksilan tekojääkenttä or just Pakkala, is a bandy field in the district of Raksila in Oulu, Finland. It also serves as a speed skating arena and in the summer it is used for basketball and roller skating.

The arena is home field for the local bandy clubs including Oulun Luistinseura (OLS).

References 

Bandy venues in Finland
Sports venues in Oulu
Sports venues completed in 1997
1997 establishments in Finland